TP is the debut album by former NBA player Tony Parker. It was released in 2007 for Music One and was recorded in French.

Track listing
"Intro" – 1:36
"Balance-toi" (Swing Yourself) – 3:31
"On dit quoi?" (You Said What?) (feat. Eloquence) – 3:30
"Premier Love" (First Love) (feat. Rickwel) – 3:32
"La Famille" (The Family) (feat. Eddie B) – 3:56
"Bienvenue dans le Texas" (Welcome to Texas) (feat. Booba) – 3:58
"Les clefs de la réussite" (The Key to Success) (feat. Don Choa and Soprano) – 4:21
"L'effet papillon" (The Butterfly Effect) (feat. Jamie Foxx) – 3:58
"Pourquoi je rappe?" (Why I Rap?) – 3:18
"Génération motivée" (Reasoned Generation) (feat. K-Reen) – 4:45
"Gametime" – 5:25

References

External links
TP at AllMusic

2007 debut albums
Tony Parker albums
French-language albums